Raorchestes shillongensis (common names: Shillong bubble-nest frog, Shillong bush frog, Xmas frog) is a species of frog in the family Rhacophoridae. It is endemic to Greater Shillong in North East India. It is known from the Khasi Hills in the region of Shillong, Meghalaya in north-eastern India. It has been categorized as Critically Endangered because its extent of occurrence is less than 100 km2, its distribution is severely fragmented, there is continuing decline in the extent and quality of its habitat, and in the number of mature individuals in and around Shillong, in Meghalaya, northeastern India.

Population
The population is believed to have declined significantly. While it was considered to be abundant in the 1970s, it is now difficult to find specimens of this frog. Recent ongoing (post 1993) vocalization surveys in and around Malki Forest (the type locality) have failed to record this species.

Habitat and threats
This species inhabits tropical moist forests. Selective logging, the collection of wood for subsistence use, and urbanization, are all major threats to the species' habitat.

Conservation
It is not known whether or not this species occurs in any protected areas, but habitat protection and maintenance are urgent priorities for this species, and additional survey work is necessary to assess its current population status.

Documentary
Thumbelina - the story of an Xmas Frog by award-winning Indian wildlife filmmaker Ashwika Kapur is a documentary on Raorchestes shillongensis.

References

shillongensis
Endemic fauna of India
Frogs of India
Taxonomy articles created by Polbot
Amphibians described in 1973